Edward Pollard may refer to:

 Edward A. Pollard (1832–1872), American author and journalist
 Edward Pollard (politician), Houston politician
 Ed Pollard (born 1962), Barbadian boxer